Lerwick Observatory (also known as Lerwick Magnetic Observatory) is a British meteorological observatory located near the port at Lerwick, Shetland Islands, United Kingdom. It is one of three permanent geomagnetic observatories in the United Kingdom.

History 
The Norwegian government requested that the British establish a meteorological observatory in the Shetland Islands, after Roald Amundsen expressed a desire to compare notes on the Aurora Borealis he observed during his expedition in 1920.

The observatory is operated by the Met Office.

References 

Met Office
Meteorological observatories
Lerwick